Paul Miller Racing is an American auto racing team that is part of Paul Miller Auto Group and associated with former racing driver . The team has operations that are headquartered in Buford, Georgia;  the Racing team also has operations in Parsippany, New Jersey.

Members of the team include Bryan Sellers and Paul Miller's son Bryce Miller.

The team won the WeatherTech SportsCar Championship in 2018 in the GT Daytona class, running a Lamborghini Huracán GT3.

References

American auto racing teams
American Le Mans Series teams
WeatherTech SportsCar Championship teams